Sally Gimson (née Malcolm-Smith)  is a British Labour Party politician, ex-councillor in the Highgate ward of Camden Council.

Career
Gimson graduated from the University of Cambridge in 1987 with a degree in Modern Languages, before training as a journalist.

Until her election to Camden Council she was Head of Public Policy at Victim Support, and she was previously Director of Communications at the Family and Parenting Institute.

Sally Gimson was an unsuccessful parliamentary candidate in the South Leicestershire constituency in the 2010 General Election. She served in the council cabinet as the chief of adult health and social care until she challenged Council leader Sarah Hayward losing by 24 votes to 15, subsequently returning to the backbenches. On 27 October 2019 Gimson was selected by Bassetlaw Constituency Labour Party to be their prospective parliamentary candidate for the next general election, although she did not end up contesting that position in December 2019 due to a veto by the Labour NEC.

Personal life
She is married to political journalist Andrew Gimson, with whom she has three children. She has previously written about hers and her husband's opposing political positions.

References

External links
Articles by Sally Gimson on Labour List
Articles by Sally Gimson on the New Statesman
democracy.camden.gov.uk

Councillors in the London Borough of Camden
Year of birth missing (living people)
Living people
Labour Party (UK) parliamentary candidates
Labour Party (UK) councillors
Women councillors in England